Philip Henry Gosse FRS (6 April 1810 – 23 August 1888), known to his friends as Henry, was an English naturalist and populariser of natural science, an early improver of the seawater aquarium, and a painstaking innovator in the study of marine biology. Gosse created and stocked the first public aquarium at the London Zoo in 1853, and coined the term "aquarium" when he published the first manual, The Aquarium: An Unveiling of the Wonders of the Deep Sea, in 1854. His work was the catalyst for an aquarium craze in early Victorian England.

Gosse was also the author of Omphalos, an attempt to reconcile the geological ages presupposed by Charles Lyell with the biblical account of creation. After his death, Gosse was portrayed as an overbearing father of uncompromising religious views in Father and Son (1907), a memoir written by his son, Edmund Gosse, a poet and critic, though the son's description of Gosse has since been described as having included "error, distortion...unwarranted claims, misrepresentation" and "abuse of the written record".

Early life
Philip Henry Gosse was born in Worcester in 1810, second of four children of Thomas Gosse (1765-1844), a mezzotint engraver and itinerant painter of miniature portraits, and Hannah (née Best), a lady's maid before her marriage. He spent his childhood mostly in Poole, Dorset, where his aunt, Susan Bell, taught him to draw and introduced him to zoology. She had similarly taught her own son, Thomas Bell, who was twenty years older and later became a great friend to Gosse.

At fifteen he began work as a clerk in the counting house of George Garland and Sons in Poole. In 1827 he sailed to Newfoundland to serve as a clerk in the Carbonear premises of Slade, Elson and Co. There he became a dedicated, self-taught student of Newfoundland entomology, "the first person systematically to investigate and to record the entomology" of the island.While living in Carbonear, he wrote and illustrated an "exquisite" volume, never published, the "Entomologia Terra Novae". In 1832 Gosse experienced a religious conversion and, as he described it, "solemnly, deliberately and uprightly, took God for my God."

In 1835 he left Newfoundland for Compton, Lower Canada (Quebec), where he farmed unsuccessfully for three years. He originally tried to establish a commune with two of his religious friends. The experience deepened his love for natural history, and locals referred to him as "that crazy Englishman who goes about picking up bugs." During this time he became a member of the Natural History Society of Montreal and submitted specimens to its museum.

In 1838 Gosse taught eight months for Reuben Saffold, the owner of Belvoir plantation, near Pleasant Hill, Alabama. In this period, planters often hired private tutors to teach their children. Gosse also studied and drew the local flora and fauna, assembling an unpublished volume, Entomologia Alabamensis, on insect life in the state. The cotton plantation was in the Black Belt of Alabama, and Saffold held numerous enslaved labourers. Gosse recorded his negative impressions of slavery, later published as Letters from Alabama (1859).

Young naturalist and lay preacher
Returning to England in 1839, Gosse was hard pressed to make a living, subsisting on eightpence a day ("one herring eaten as slowly as possible, and a little bread"). His fortunes began to improve when John Van Voorst, the leading publisher of naturalist writing, agreed, on the recommendation of Thomas Bell, to publish his Canadian Naturalist (1840). The book, set as a conversation between a father and his son (a son Gosse did not yet have), was widely praised. It is now considered to demonstrate that Gosse "had a practical grasp of the importance of conservation, far ahead of his time."

Gosse opened a "Classical and Commercial School for Young Gentlemen" while keeping detailed records of his microscopic investigations of pond life, especially cyclopidae and rotifera. He also began to preach to the Wesleyan Methodists and lead a Bible class. In 1842, he became so captivated by the doctrine of the Second Coming of Christ that he severed his connection with the Methodists and joined the Plymouth Brethren. These dissenters emphasized the Second Coming while rejecting liturgy and an ordained ministry—although they otherwise endorsed the traditional doctrines of Christianity as represented by the creeds of the Methodist and the Anglican Church.

In 1843, Gosse gave up the school to write An Introduction to Zoology for the Society for Promoting Christian Knowledge (SPCK) and to draw some of the illustrations. Writing the work inspired him to further his interest in the flora and fauna of the seashore. He showed in his book that he was a creationist, which was typical of pre-Darwinian naturalists.

In October 1844 Gosse sailed to Jamaica, where he served as a professional collector for dealer Hugh Cuming. Although Gosse worked hard during his eighteen months on the island, he later called this period his " 'holiday' in Jamaica." Gosse's study specialized in birds, and Gosse has been called "the father of Jamaican ornithology". Gosse hired black youths as assistants and especially praised one of them, Samuel Campbell, in his Jamaican books. For Christian companionship he enjoyed the company of Moravian missionaries and their black converts, and he preached regularly to the Moravian congregation.

On his return to London in 1846, Gosse wrote a trilogy on the natural history of Jamaica including A Naturalist's Sojourn in Jamaica (1851). It is described as "written in a congenial style and firmly established his reputation both as a naturalist and a writer."

In the field of herpetology, Gosse described several new species of reptiles endemic to Jamaica.

Popular nature writer
Back in England, Gosse wrote books both in his field and out; a quick volume he produced for the Society for Promoting Christian Knowledge (SPCK) was Monuments of Ancient Egypt, a land he had never visited and never would.  As his financial situation stabilized, Gosse courted Emily Bowes, a forty-one-year-old member of the Brethren, who was both a strong personality and a gifted writer of evangelical tracts. They married in November 1848, and their union was an extremely happy one.  As D. J. Taylor has written, "the word 'uxorious' seems to have minted to define" Gosse. Gosse's only son was born on 21 September 1849. Gosse noted the event in his diary with the words, "E. delivered of a son. Received green swallow from Jamaica"—an amusing conjunction which Edmund later described as demonstrating only the order of events: the boy had arrived first.

Gosse wrote a succession of books and articles on natural history, some of which were (in his own words) "pot-boilers" for religious publications. (At the time, accounts of God's creation were considered appropriate Sabbath reading for children.)  As L. C. Croft has written, 
"Much of Gosse's success was due to the fact that he was essentially a field naturalist who was able to impart to his readers something of the thrill of studying living animals at first hand rather than the dead disjointed ones of the museum shelf. In addition to this he was a skilled scientific draughtsman who was able to illustrate his books himself."

Suffering from headaches, perhaps the result of overwork, Gosse, with his family, began to spend more time away from London on the Devon coast. Here along the sea shore, Gosse began serious experimentation with ways to sustain sea creatures so that they could be examined "without diving to gaze on them."  Although there had been attempts to construct what had previously been called an "aquatic vivarium" (a name Gosse found "awkward and uncouth"), Gosse published The Aquarium in 1854 and set off a mid-Victorian craze for household aquariums. The book was financially profitable for Gosse, and "the reviews were full of praise". Even in this work, Gosse used natural science to point to the necessity of salvation through the blood of Christ. In 1856 Gosse was elected a Fellow of the Royal Society, which, because he had no university position or inherited wealth, gave him "a standing he otherwise lacked."

A few months before Gosse was honoured, his wife discovered that she had breast cancer. Rather than undergo surgery (a risky procedure in 1856), the Gosses decided to submit to the ointments of an American doctor, Jesse Weldon Fell, who if not a charlatan, was certainly on the fringe of contemporary medical practice. After much suffering, Emily Gosse died on 9 February 1857. She entrusted her husband with their son's salvation, and perhaps her death drove Gosse into his "strange severities and eccentric prohibitions."

Omphalos
In the months following Emily's death, Gosse worked with remarkable diligence on a book that he may have viewed as the most important of his career. Although a failure both financially and intellectually, it is the book by which he is best remembered. Gosse believed that he had discovered a theory that might neatly resolve the seeming contradiction in the age of the earth between the evidence of God's Word and the evidence of His creation as expounded by such contemporary geologists as Charles Lyell. In 1857, two years before the publication of Charles Darwin's Origin of Species, Gosse published Omphalos: an Attempt to Untie the Geological Knot and thereby created what has been called the Omphalos hypothesis.

In what Stephen Jay Gould has called "gloriously purple prose", Gosse argued that if one assumed creation ex nihilo, there would necessarily be traces of previous existence that had never actually occurred. "Omphalos" is Greek for "navel", and Gosse argued that the first man, Adam, did not require a navel because he was never born; nevertheless he must have had one, as do all complete human beings, just as God must have created trees with rings that they never grew. Thus, Gosse argued that the fossil record—even coprolites—might also be evidence of life that had never actually existed but which may have been instantly formed by God at the moment of creation.

The general response was "as the Westminster Review put it, that Gosse's theory was "too monstrous for belief.'" Even his friend, the novelist Charles Kingsley, wrote that he had read "no other book which so staggered and puzzled" him, that he could not believe that God had "written on the rocks one enormous and superfluous lie for all mankind." Journalists later sniggered that God had apparently hidden fossils in the rocks to tempt geologists to infidelity.

Omphalos sold poorly and was eventually rebound with a new title, Creation, "in case the obscure one had had an effect on sales." The problem was not with the title. In 1869 most of the edition was sold as waste paper.

Later career
According to Edmund Gosse, his father's career was destroyed by his "strange act of wilfulness" in publishing Omphalos; Edmund claimed his father had "closed the doors upon himself forever." But, during the next three years Gosse published more than thirty scientific papers and four books.

By this time Gosse and his son had moved permanently from London to St Marychurch, Devon. (Gosse refused to use the "St" and even gave his address as Torquay so as not to have anything to do with the "so-called Church of England".)  He soon became the pastor and overseer of the Brethren meeting. It was first held in a loft over a stable but shortly, under Gosse's preaching and peacemaking, in finer quarters—which he perhaps financed himself. His son said "he soon lost confidence in the Plymouth Brethren also, and for the last thirty years of his life he was really unconnected with any Christian body whatsoever."

During this period, Gosse made a special study of sea anemones (Actiniae) and in 1860 published Actinologia Britannica. Reviewers especially praised the colour lithographs made from Gosse's watercolours. The Literary Gazette said that Gosse now stood "alone and unrivalled in the extremely difficult art of drawing objects of zoology so as to satisfy the requirements of science" as well as providing "vivid aesthetic impressions".

In 1860 he met and married Eliza Brightwen (1813–1900), a kindly, tolerant Quaker who shared Gosse's intense interest in both natural history and the well-being of his son. Gosse's second marriage was as happy as his first. In 1862 he wrote that Eliza was "a true yoke-fellow, in love, in spirit and in service."

By this time Gosse was "very comfortably off" with the earnings from his books and dividends from his investments. In 1864 Eliza received a substantial legacy that allowed Gosse to retire from his career as a professional writer and live in "congenial obscurity".  The Gosses lived simply, invested some of their income and gave more away to charity, especially to foreign missionaries, including ones sent to the "Popish, priest-ridden Irish".

To Gosse's great grief, his son rejected Christianity—though almost certainly not as early or as dramatically as Edmund portrayed the break in Father and Son. But Gosse sponsored the publication of Edmund's early poetry, which gave the younger man entrée to new friends of literary importance, and the two men "came out of the years of conflict with their relationship wary but intact." Henry and Eliza welcomed Edmund's wife to the family and enjoyed visits with their three grandchildren.

Meanwhile, the ever active Gosse had taken up the study of orchids and exchanged a number of letters on the subject with Darwin, though he never published on this subject himself.  His penultimate enthusiasm was with the genitalia of butterflies, about which he published a paper in the Transactions of the Linnean Society But before his death he returned to rotifera, with much of his research appearing in a two-volume study written with another zoologist, Charles Thomas Hudson.

His wife recalled that Gosse's final illness may have been caused by his becoming chilled while trying to adjust his telescope at an open window on a winter night. Gosse had prayed regularly that he might not taste death but meet Christ in the air at his Second Coming, and he was bitterly disappointed when he realized that he would die like everyone else.

Father and Son
After his father's death, Edmund Gosse published a typical Victorian biography, The Life of Philip Henry Gosse (1890). After reading it, the writer George Moore suggested to Edmund that it contained "the germ of a great book." Edmund Gosse revised his material and first published his notable memoir anonymously as Father and Son in 1907. It has never gone out of print. The reaction of readers to Henry's personality and character, as represented in Father and Son, has included phrases such as "scientific crackpot", "bible-soaked romantic", "a stern and repressive father", and a "pulpit-thumping Puritan throwback to the seventeenth century".

A modern editor of Father and Son has rejected this portrait of Philip Henry Gosse, on the grounds that his own "writings reveal a genuinely sweet character." Ann Thwaite, the biographer of both Gosses, has established just how inaccurate Edmund's recollections of his childhood were. Henry James remarked that Edmund Gosse had "a genius for inaccuracy". Although Edmund went out of his way to declare that the story of Father and Son was "scrupulously true," Thwaite cites a dozen occasions on which either Edmund's "memory betray[ed] him (he admitted it was 'like a colander')", or he "changed things deliberately to make a better story." Thwaite argues that Edmund could only preserve his self-respect, in comparison to his father's superior abilities, by demolishing the latter's character. Nearly a century after Gosse’s death, a study based on his published remarks and writings about his father concluded that in varying degrees, they are “riddled with error, distortion, contradictions, unwarranted claims, misrepresentation, abuse of the written record, and unfamiliarity with the subject."

In popular culture
Playwright Dennis Potter adapted Father and Son as the television play Where Adam Stood, first broadcast on BBC One in 1976. Gosse was played by Alan Badel. Reviewers said that the play portrayed Gosse more sympathetically than did Edmund Gosse's book.

Father and Son was also adapted for BBC Radio 4 in 2005 by Nick Warburton. Roger Allam played Gosse and Derek Jacobi, Edmund.

Ann Lingard's novel Seaside Pleasures (2014) explores the relationship of Gosse and his wife Emily from the point of view of a female student in his shore-class.

Commemoration 
In 2021, a blue plaque was placed at Poole United Reformed Church where Gosse worshipped as a young boy. In November 2022, a sea-life mural dedicated to Gosse was unveiled in Poole Town Centre.

Works

  The Canadian Naturalist: a series of conversations on the natural history of Lower Canada (1840).
 An Introduction to Zoology (1844).
 The Ocean (1844), edition of 1874 under the title The Wonders of the Great Deep; or, the physical, animal, geological and vegetable curiosities of the ocean.
 The Birds of Jamaica (1847)
 The Monuments of Ancient Egypt, and their relation to the Word of God (1847).
 Natural History. Mammalia (1848).
 Popular British Ornithology; containing a familiar and technical description of the Birds of the British Isles (1849).
 Illustrations of the Birds of Jamaica (1849).
 Natural History. Birds (1849).
 Sacred streams: The Ancient and Modern History of the Rivers of the Bible (1850).
 Natural History. Reptiles (1850).
 A Naturalist’s Sojourn in Jamaica (1851).
 Natural History. Fishes (1851).
 The History of the Jews, from the Christian era to the dawn of the Reformation (1851).
 A Text-book of Zoology for schools (1851).
 Assyria: her manners and customs, arts and aims. Restored from the monuments (1852).
 A Naturalist's Rambles on the Devonshire Coast (1853).
  The Aquarium: an unveiling of the wonders of the deep sea (1854).
 Natural History. Mollusca (1854).
 A Handbook to the Marine Aquarium: containing Instructions for constructing, stocking, and maintaining a tank, and for collecting plants and animals (1855).
 Manual of Marine Zoology for the British Isles (1855–1856).
 Tenby: a seaside holiday (1856).
 A Memorial of the Last Days on Earth of Emily Gosse (1857)
 Omphalos: an attempt to untie the geological knot (1857), modern editions in 1998 and 2003.
 Life in its Lower, Intermediate, and Higher Forms; or, manifestations of the divine wisdom in the natural history of animals (1857).
 Actinologia Britannica: a history of the British Sea-Anemones and Corals. (1858–60).
 Evenings at the Microscope: or, researches among the minute organs and forms of animal life (1859).
 Letters from Alabama, chiefly relating to Natural History (1859).
 The Romance of Natural History (1860–61).
 A Year at the Shore (1865).
 Land and Sea (1865)
 The Revelation. How is it to be interpreted ? (1866).
 Imperial Bible-Dictionary (104 articles) (1866)
 The Mysteries of God: a series of expositions of Holy Scripture (1884).

Bibliography
 
Gosse, Edmund, Father and Son (New York: Charles Scribner's Sons, 1907); Oxford World Classics edition, 2004.
 
Croft, L.R., "Gosse, Philip Henry (1810–1888)," Oxford Dictionary of National Biography, 2004.
Wertheimer, Douglas, "Gosse, Philip Henry," Dictionary of Canadian Biography.
Rendle-Short, John, Green Eye of the Storm (Edinburgh: Banner of Truth Trust, 1998).
Borges, Jorge Luis, "The Creation and P. H. Gosse," in Other Inquisitions (trans. Ruth Simms) (Austin: University of Texas Press, 1964).
Gould, Stephen Jay, "Adam's Navel," in The Flamingo's Smile: Reflections in Natural History (New York: W. W. Norton, 1987).
Brunner, Bernd, The Ocean at Home: An Illustrated History of the Aquarium (trans. Ashley Marc Slapp). (London: Reaktion Books, 2011).
Wotton, Roger, Walking with Gosse: Natural History, Creation and Religious Conflicts (Southampton: Clio Publishing, 2012)
Freeman, R.B. and Douglas Wertheimer, Philip Henry Gosse: A Bibliography. Folkestone, Kent: Dawson, 1980.

References

Further reading
"Philip Henry Gosse," in Tom Taylor and Michael Taylor, Aves: A Survey of the Literature of Neotropical Ornithology, Baton Rouge: Louisiana State University Libraries, 2011.

External links

 
 
 Anemone: Natural Histories. BBC Radio 4
 Works by Philip Henry Gosse at Biodiversity Heritage Library

1810 births
1888 deaths
19th-century evangelicals
British Christian creationists
Fellows of the Royal Society
British Plymouth Brethren
English naturalists
Evangelical writers
English evangelicals
Scientists from Worcester, England
People from Poole